Acleris harenna is a species of moth of the family Tortricidae. It is found in Ethiopia, where it is only known from the Bale Mountains.

The wingspan is about 18 mm. The ground colour of the forewings is whitish with brownish and grey suffusions to the middle, the colour is brownish ferruginous in the distal part. The hindwings are grey.

Etymology
The species name refers to the Harenna Forest, the type locality.

References

Moths described in 2010
harenna
Moths of Africa